The fourth season of Greece's Next Top Model (abbreviated as GNTMgr) premiered on September 8, 2019 and was the second season to air on Star Channel.

Vicky Kaya, Angelos Bratis, Iliana Papageorgiou and Dimitris Skoulos returned as judges, while Elena Chistopoulou and Genevieve Majari returned, also,  to their roles.

The prizes for this season included a modelling contract with PLACE models in Hamburg, a cover and spread with Madame Figaro magazine, a contract with Dust & Cream cosmetics and a cash prize of €50,000.

Approximately 7000 girls applied for the show. 400 girls were invited to the audition rounds. 70 girls were then selected to enter the Bootcamp. 24 girls, this season, were chosen to enter into the models' house.

The winners of this season are Anna Maria Iliadou & Katia Tarabanko. The double win was due to the viewers not being able to vote online due to the site crashing, leaving only the judges scores in which there was a tie. 

The two winners were photographed in a double cover and spread in the Madame Figaro Greece April 2020 issue.

Cast

Contestants
(Ages stated are at start of contest)

Judges
 Vicky Kaya
 Angelos Bratis
 Iliana Papageorgiou
 Dimitris Skoulos

Other cast members
 Elena Christopoulou – mentor
 Genevieve Majari – art director

Episode summaries

Episodes 1–5: Auditions
The show kicked off with the audition phase. Auditions took place in two different cities: Athens and Thessaloniki. The auditions aired for the first five episodes of the show. During the auditions, the girls had a brief interview with the judges while they also walked in swimwear, if asked. In order to advance, they needed a "yes" from at least 3 of the judges.

Episodes 6–7: Bootcamp
During the bootcamp, the 70 girls that advanced from the auditions took part. For the first part of the bootcamp, the girls had to walk in a fashion runway for the Greek fashion designer George Eleftheriades. The runway took place at Rouf railway station in Athens. Before the bootcamp started, the judges gave Eleftheria Karnava a golden pass, so she qualified automatically to the models' house. For the second part of bootcamp, 41 girls were shot by the photographer Kosmas Koumianos. The photoshoot took place in Athens Reef Riviera beach and girls wear swimsuits and posed at the beach. A total of 24 girls passed to the models' house.

Golden Pass Winner: Eleftheria Karnava
Featured photographer: Kosmas Koumianos

Episode 8: Vertical Runway
Original airdate: 

Top 2: Eleftheria Karnava & Konstantina Florou
First call-out: Konstantina Florou
Eliminated outside of judging panel: Katerina Peftitsi & Popi Galetsa

Episode 9: Snakes
Original airdate: 

First call-out: Nina Tzivanidou
Bottom two: Argyro Maglari & Gloria Deniki
Eliminated: Argyro Maglari
Featured photographer: Apostolis Koukousas

Episode 10: Celebrate Your Body
Original airdate: 

First call-out: Keisi Mizhiu
Bottom two: Silia Evangelou & Ioanna Kyritsi
Eliminated: Silia Evangelou
Featured photographer: George Malekakis

Episode 11: The Makeover
Original airdate:

Episode 12: Containers
Original airdate: 

First call-out: Eleftheria Karnava
Bottom two: Anna Hatzi & Lydia Katsanikaki
Eliminated: Lydia Katsanikaki
Featured photographer: Marios Kazakos

Episode 13: Hanging Fashion
Original airdate: 

First call-out: Katia Tarabanko
Bottom two: Gloria Deniki & Ioanna Kyritsi
Eliminated: Ioanna Kyritsi
Featured photographer: Vasilis Topouslidis

Episode 14: Rodeo
Original airdate: 

First call-out: Anna Hatzi & Konstantina Florou
Bottom two: Gloria Deniki & Olga Kalogirou
Eliminated: Gloria Deniki
Featured photographer: Katerina Tsatsani

Episode 15: Floating Ball
Original airdate: 
 
First call-out: Anna Hatzi
Bottom two: Nina Tzivanidou & Spyroula Kaizer
Eliminated: Nina Tzivanidou
Featured photographers: Athina Liaskou, Bill Georgoussis

Episode 16: Bratis Fashion Show
Original airdate: 

Immune: Anna Hatzi
First call-out: Anna Maria Iliadou
Bottom two: Spyroula Kaizer & Suzanna Kuol
Eliminated: Suzanna Kuol
Featured photographer: Kostas Sapi

Episode 17: Farming
Original airdate: 

Quit: Martina Khafichuk
Returned: Suzanna Kuol
Challenge winner: Hara Pappa
First call-out: Keisi Mizhiu
Bottom two: Marina Grigoriou & Olga Kalogirou
Eliminated: Olga Kalogirou
Featured photographers: Kostas Sapi, Freddie F

Episode 18: Illusions
Original airdate: 

Challenge winners: Eleftheria Karnava & Emmanuela Maina
First call-out: Ilda Kroni
Bottom two: Eleftheria Karnava & Suzanna Kuol
Eliminated: Suzanna Kuol
Featured photographer: Stefanos Papadopoulos

Episode 19: Style On A Rush
Original airdate: 

First call-out: Maria Michalopoulou
Bottom two: Ilda Kroni & Spyroula Kaizer
Eliminated: Spyroula Kaizer
Featured photographer: Athina Liaskou

Episode 20: Perfect Influencer
Original airdate: 

First call-out: Katia Tarabanko
Bottom two: Anna Hatzi & Marina Grigoriou 
Eliminated: Marina Grigoriou 
Featured photographer: Aggelos Potamianos

Episode 21: MasterChef
Original airdate: 

Challenge winner: Katia Tarabanko
First call-out: Anna Hatzi
Bottom two: Eleftheria Karnava & Keisi Mizhiu
Eliminated: Eleftheria Karnava
Featured photographer: Nikos Maliakos

Episode 22: Urban Mary Poppins
Original airdate: 

Challenge winner: Hara Pappa
First call-out: Hara Pappa
Bottom two: Asimina Charitou & Emmanuela Maina
Eliminated: Emmanuela Maina
Featured photographer: Petros Sofikitis

Episode 23: Survival Camp
Original airdate: 

Challenge winner: Maria Michalopoulou
First call-out: Maria Michalopoulou
Bottom three: Asimina Charitou, Hara Pappa & Katia Tarabanko
Eliminated: None
Featured photographer: Akis Paraskevopoulos

Episode 24: Madame Figaro
Original airdate: 

Returned: Eleftheria Karnava, Emmanuela Maina & Popi Galetsa
First call-out: Maria Michalopoulou
Bottom two: Asimina Charitou & Emmanuela Maina
Eliminated: Emmanuela Maina
Featured photographer: Christos Predoulis

Episode 25: Heaven
Original airdate: 

Challenge winners: Katia Tarabanko & Keisi Mizhiu
First call-out: Anna Hatzi
Bottom two: Asimina Charitou & Maria Michalopoulou
Eliminated: Asimina Charitou
Featured photographer: Panos Giannakopoulos

Episode 26: Fashion Siamese
Original airdate: 

Challenge winner: Anna Hatzi
First call-out: Maria Michalopoulou
Bottom two: Anna Hatzi & Eleftheria Karnava
Eliminated: Eleftheria Karnava
Featured photographer: Dionysis Koutsis

Episode 27: Advertising Teaser
Original airdate: 

First call-out: Katia Tarabanko & Keisi Mizhiu
Bottom two: Konstantina Florou & Popi Galetsa
Eliminated: Both

Episode 28: Constructing Fashion
Original airdate: 

First call-out: Katia Tarabanko
Bottom two: Anna Hatzi & Ilda Kroni
Eliminated: Ilda Kroni
Featured photographer: Apostolis Koukousas

Episode 29: Red Riding Hood
Original airdate: 

Challenge winner: Anna Hatzi & Anna Maria Iliadou
First call-out: Anna Maria Iliadou
Bottom two: Anna Hatzi & Hara Pappa
Eliminated: Anna Hatzi
Featured photographer: Kosmas Koumianos

Episode 30: Trip To Milan
Original airdate: 

Challenge winners: Katia Tarabanko & Keisi Mizhiu
First call-out: Anna Maria Iliadou
Bottom two:  Hara Pappa & Katia Tarabanko
Eliminated: Hara Pappa
Featured photographer: Leonidas Diamantidis

Episode 31: Widows - Racing Cars & Girls
Original airdate: 

First call-out: Keisi Mizhiu
Bottom two: Anna Maria Iliadou & Maria Michalopoulou
Eliminated: Maria Michalopoulou
Featured photographer: Nicolas Aristidou

Episode 32: The Preparation / Towels, The Party / Havana Club, The After Party / Dancing In The Rain  - Final
Original airdate: December 19, 2019

Final three: Anna Maria Iliadou, Katia Tarabanko & Keisi Mizhiu
Third place: Keisi Mizhiu
Greece's Next Top Model: Anna Maria Iliadou & Katia Tarabanko
Featured photographer: Dimitris Skoulos

Results

 The contestant was eliminated outside of judging panel
 The contestant was eliminated 
 The contestant was immune from elimination
 The contestant quit the competition
 The contestant was part of a non-elimination bottom three
 The contestant won the competition

Bottom two

 The contestant was eliminated outside of judging panel
 The contestant was put through collectively to the next round
 The contestant quit the competition
 The contestant was eliminated after her first time in the bottom two
 The contestant was eliminated after her second time in the bottom two
 The contestant was eliminated after her third time in the bottom two 
 The contestant was eliminated after her fourth time in the bottom two 
 The contestant was eliminated after her fifth time in the bottom two
 The contestant was eliminated in the final judging and placed as the runner-up

Average  call-out order
Episode 8 (except for top 2 and bottom 2) & 32 are not included.

Notes

Ratings

References

Greece
2019 Greek television seasons